Benoît Paire was the defending champion from when the event was last held in 2019, but chose to participate in Geneva instead.

Stefanos Tsitsipas won the title, defeating Cameron Norrie in the final 6–3, 6–3.

Seeds
The top four seeds received a bye into the second round.

Draw

Finals

Top half

Bottom half

Qualifying

Seeds

Qualifiers

Lucky losers

Qualifying draw

First qualifier

Second qualifier

Third qualifier

Fourth qualifier

References

External links
 Main draw
 Qualifying draw

2021 ATP Lyon Open - Singles